Rupa (sometimes spelled Roopa) is a given name, current in the Indian Sub-Continent. Notable people with this name include:

Females
Rupa Bhawani (1620–1720), Kashmiri poet
Roopa Ganguly (born 1966), Indian actress
Rupa Bajwa (born 1976), Indian writer
Rupa Saini (born 1954), Indian field hockey player
Rupa So.Si. Chaudhari, Nepalese politician
Rupa Huq (born 1972), politician, columnist, and academic, UK
Rupa Marya (born 1975), Indian-American singer
Rupa Manjari (born 1990), Indian actress

Males
Rupa Goswami (1489–1564), Indian philosopher
Rupa Karunathilake (1933–2011), Sri Lankan politician